In military terms, 125th Division or 125th Infantry Division may refer to:

 125th Division (People's Republic of China), formed 1948, later redesignated as the 129th Division
 125th Division (2nd Formation)(People's Republic of China), 1966–1985
 125th Infantry Division (Wehrmacht)
 125th Division (Imperial Japanese Army)